1 Timothy 6 is the sixth and final chapter of the First Epistle to Timothy in the New Testament of the Christian Bible. The author has been traditionally identified as Paul the Apostle since as early as AD 180, although most modern scholars consider the letter pseudepigraphical, perhaps written as late as the first half of the second century AD.

This chapter includes direction regarding the conduct of Christian slaves, renewed commentary on those who teach false doctrine, and the closing comments of the letter.

Text
The original text was written in Koine Greek. This chapter is divided into 21 verses.

Textual witnesses
Some early manuscripts containing the text of this chapter are:
Codex Sinaiticus (AD 330–360)
Codex Alexandrinus (400–440)
Codex Freerianus (c. 450; extant verses 1–2, 9–11, 17–19)
Uncial 061 (c. 450; extant verses 2–8)
Codex Claromontanus (c. 550)
Codex Coislinianus (c. 550; extant verses 9–13)

Slaves and masters (6:1–2)

Verse 2
And those who have believing masters, let them not despise them because they are brethren, but rather serve them because those who are benefited are believers and beloved.
Teach and exhort these things.
In Codex Sinaiticus, the words ὅτι ἀδελφοί εἰσιν (hoti adelphoi eisin, "because they are brethren") are omitted, possible through a scribal oversight.

False teaching (6:3–10)

Verse 7
For we brought nothing into this world, and it is certain we can carry nothing out.
Cross reference: Job 1:21; Psalm 49:17; Ecclesiastes 5:15
"And it is certain": is apparently rendered from the Greek conjunction  which usually means "because", but here has the sense "so that". This unusual sense may cause the existence of textual variation when scribes might attempt to correct the presumptive error:
the simple conjunction  is supported by א*, A, F, G, 048, 33, 81, 1739, 1881. 
 ("it is true that"): supported by manuscripts D*, some versional and patristic witnesses.
 ("it is clear that"): supported by א, D, Ψ, 1175, 1241, 1505, and all other manuscripts.

Verse 9
But those who desire to be rich fall into temptation and a snare, and into many foolish and harmful lusts which drown men in destruction and perdition.
"Temptation" (Greek:): in this verse has the 'specific passive sense of being lured into sin' (Matthew 6:13; 1 Corinthians 10:13; James 1:12).

Verse 10
For the love of money is a root of all kinds of evil, for which some have strayed from the faith in their greediness, and pierced themselves through with many sorrows.

Final exhortation to Timothy (6:11–16)

Verse 15
 [Lord Jesus Christ's appearing] which He will manifest in His own time, He who is the blessed and only Potentate, the King of kings and Lord of lords, 
See: Names and titles of Jesus in the New Testament

Verse 16
who alone has immortality, dwelling in unapproachable light, whom no man has seen or can see, to whom be honor and everlasting power. Amen.

 "Who alone has immortality": John Gill comments that "the soul of men, the angels and the body of men after resurrection are immortal, but none of these have immortality of themselves, because they have it from God, who alone originally and essentially has it".

 "Dwelling in unapproachable light" (KJV: "that light which no man can approach unto"): in this current mortal and frail state of men, that even the angels cannot bear, but have to cover their faces with their wings, because God is light itself and fountain of lights to all his creatures.

 "Whom no man has seen or can see": none but in Christ, at least spiritually, and that but very imperfectly in the current state: frailty, sin and mortality of human nature must be removed away, to inherit the kingdom of God, and enjoy the beatific vision of him, which no man now does, or can see.

 "To whom be honor and everlasting power": which may be regarded either as a wish, that such honor, power, and glory might be ascribed to him, or as an assertion that it is given to him, by the angels as well as the saints in heaven and in earth.

Exhortation for the wealthy (6:17–19)
This part can be seen as an interlude in the exhortation to Timothy (6:11–16; 6:20–21) or alternatively the previous exhortation (6:11–16) can be seen as an 'interruption' in Paul's discourse on wealth (6:3–10; 6:17–19), but in either case, the topic of wealth here seems to be a continuation of the theme of 6:3–10. In this short pericope, the 'sound of riches' is repeated (a literary device called paronomasia, "repetition of the same sound") four times, could be heard by those listening to the reading of the epistle:  ("the rich ... riches ... richly [generously] ... to be rich"), which are, respectively, a personal noun, an objective noun, an adverb, and a verb.

Verse 17
Command those who are rich in this present age not to be haughty, nor to trust in uncertain riches but in the living God, who gives us richly all things to enjoy.
"Command": This is the fifth of the five times in this epistle Paul uses the forms of the verb parangellō ("I charge you"; the others see 1:3; 4:11; 5:7; 6:13) for Timothy to "charge, command or instruct" the people, in this verse: to 'those who are rich'.

Epistolary closing (6:20–21)

Verses 20–21
O Timothy! Guard what was committed to your trust, avoiding the profane and idle babblings and contradictions of what is falsely called knowledge— by professing it some have strayed concerning the faith.
Grace be with you. Amen.
"Idle babblings": or "empty chatter"
"Grace": as benediction occurs typically in the last words of Pauline epistles (etc.), ordinarily with divine source (for example, "the Lord Jesus" in Romans 16:20; 1 Thessalonians 5:28) and the intended recipient ("you all", ; "your spirit", ;  or "you" (plural), Romans 16:20; 1 Corinthians 16:23), but in this verse and the identical , the divine source is omitted, 'but may be assumed from the pattern elsewhere'.

See also
 Bishop
 Pontius Pilate
 Jesus Christ
 Timothy
 Related Bible parts: Deuteronomy 24, Romans 8, 1 Timothy 4, 1 Timothy 5, 2 Timothy 1

Notes

References

Sources

External links
 King James Bible - Wikisource
English Translation with Parallel Latin Vulgate
Online Bible at GospelHall.org (ESV, KJV, Darby, American Standard Version, Bible in Basic English)
Multiple bible versions at Bible Gateway (NKJV, NIV, NRSV etc.)

06